Herbert Dell Littlewood (18 December 1858 – 31 December 1925) was an English first-class cricketer and solicitor.

The son of William Dell Littlewood, he was born at Islington in December 1858. A solicitor by profession, Littlewood made five appearances in first-class cricket for the Marylebone Cricket Club between 1887 and 1896, scoring 86 runs with a highest score of 35. He changed his name to Herbert Dell Littlewood-Clarke in September 1894. Littlewood died at Ramsgate on New Year's Eve in 1925.

References

External links

1858 births
1925 deaths
People from the London Borough of Islington
English solicitors
English cricketers
Marylebone Cricket Club cricketers